Shumliany is a village in Ternopil Raion of Ternopil Oblast in western Ukraine. It belongs to Pidhaitsi urban hromada, one of the hromadas of Ukraine.  The village belonged to Berezhany Raion before 1990. The population is 1,196.

History 

There was discovered archaeological sites from chalcolithic period.

The first written reference dates from 1467.

Until 18 July 2020, Shumliany belonged to Pidhaitsi Raion. The raion was abolished in July 2020 as part of the administrative reform of Ukraine, which reduced the number of raions of Ternopil Oblast to three. The area of Pidhaitsi Raion was merged into Ternopil Raion.

Attractions 
There are two churches in Shumliany: St. Boris and Hleb (1701) and St. Volodymyr (1993).

It was built memorial crosses dedicated in abolition of serfdom, fighters for the freedom of Ukraine (1990), in honor of the 1000th anniversary of Rus baptism and in honor of the 47th anniversary of the last battle of UPA against NKGB (2007).

References

External links 
 Castles and churches of Ukraine (ukr.)
 The story about biking around to Shumlyany (ukr.)

Villages in Ternopil Raion
Saranchuky rural hromada